The 1924 Württemberg state election was held on 4 May 1924 to elect the 80 members of the Landtag of the Free People's State of Württemberg.

Results

References 

1924 elections in Germany
1924